This is a list of items of clothing, as well as clothing accessories, traditionally worn in Japan. These include items worn in  both formal and informal situations, such as the kimono and  coats, as well as items reserved for auspicious, ceremonial and/or religious occasions.

Members of the Imperial family on formal occasions, geisha, and sumo wrestlers wear variations on common traditional accessories that are not found in everyday dress, such as certain types of kimono.

For certain traditional holidays and occasions, some specific types of kimono accessories are worn.

C

D

F

G

H

I

J

K

M

N

O

S

T

U

W

Y

Z

See also
 Glossary of Shinto

References

Items traditionally worn
Japan, traditional
Glossaries of textile arts
Wikipedia glossaries using description lists